Petro Air is a charter airline based in Tripoli, Libya.

Fleet

Current fleet
The Petro Air fleet consists of the following aircraft (as of August 2019):

Former fleet
The airline previously operated the following aircraft (as of August 2017):
 1 Fokker F28 Fellowship 2000

References

External links

Airlines of Libya
Charter airlines
Economy of Tripoli, Libya